Sologne is a natural region in Centre-Val de Loire, France, extending over portions of the departements of Loiret, Loir-et-Cher and Cher. To its north is the river Loire, to its south the river Cher, while the districts of Sancerre and Berry are to its east.
Its inhabitants are known as the Solognots (masculine) and Solognotes (feminine).

Its name is thought to derive either from the Latin sœcalonia ("rye country") or sabulonia ("sandy country").

Natural regions of France

Geography
The Sologne is watered by the Cosson and the Beuvron, tributaries of the Loire, and the Sauldre, a tributary of the Cher, all three having a west-south-westerly direction.  The pools and marshes which are characteristic of the region are due to the impermeability of its soil, which is a mixture of sand and clay.

The main towns of Sologne are:
 Orléans (the most southern part of the city (La Source) and the university have been built in the woods of Sologne)
 Romorantin-Lanthenay (which hosts the Museum of Sologne)
 La Ferté-Saint-Aubin
 Salbris
 Lamotte-Beuvron
 Aubigny-sur-Nère

History
In the middle of the 19th century Napoleon III led the way in the reclamation of swamps, the planting of pines and other trees and other land alterations.  Arable farming and stock-raising are fairly flourishing in the Sologne, but there is little manufacturing activity, the cloth manufacture of Romorantin being the chief industry.  Game is abundant, and the region owes much of its revived prosperity to the creation of large sporting estates.

Cultural references
In the early 18th century, Jean-Philippe Rameau composed a famous harpsichord piece, Les Niais de Sologne, whose name translates as "the simpletons of Sologne".  The form is a rondo with two episodes that are variations on the main section.  Despite the title (which may allude to the meandering melody throughout), its use of ornamentation denotes a work of great subtlety and sophistication.

The book Le Grand Meaulnes by Alain-Fournier is set in the region of Sologne and mentions several places, such as Bourges, Vierzon, and the Cher.  It is somewhere in this region where Meaulnes becomes lost and stumbles across the mysterious estate.

Many stories and essays of Maurice Genevoix are set in Sologne.

UN World Heritage Site

The Chateau de Chambord is situated in the region.

References

John Tyrrell, ed., New Grove Dictionary of Music and Musicians, 2nd ed., s.v. "Rameau, Jean-Philippe"

Geography of France
Geography of Cher (department)
Geography of Loir-et-Cher
Geography of Loiret